Reda Hajhouj (born 2 July 1994) is a Moroccan footballer who is currently playing as a winger for Saudi Arabian club Hajer.

Club career

USM Alger 
On 15 January 2018, the last day of the winter transfer window, El Hajhouj went on an 18-month contract with USM Alger to become the second Moroccan to play with him after Saïd Baâzouz in 2000–01 season. his first game was against DRB Tadjenanet and contributed to a 3–0 win over a decisive pass and then in the next round against USM Bel-Abbès, scored his first goal was not enough where they lost 1–2.

Al-Faisaly
On 23 August 2022, Hajhouj joined Saudi Arabian club Al-Faisaly. On 30 December 2022, Hajhouj was released from his contract.

Hajer
On 18 January 2023, Hajhouj joined Hajer.

Career statistics

Club

Honours

Club
 Wydad Casablanca
 Botola (2): 2014-15, 2016-17
 CAF Champions League (1): 2017

 Ajman Club
 UAE Division One (1): 2017

External links

References

1994 births
Living people
Moroccan footballers
Footballers from Casablanca
Moroccan expatriate footballers
Association football wingers
Botola players
UAE First Division League players
Saudi First Division League players
Ajman Club players
USM Alger players
Al-Faisaly FC players
Hajer FC players
Expatriate footballers in Algeria
Moroccan expatriate sportspeople in Algeria
Expatriate footballers in Saudi Arabia
Moroccan expatriate sportspeople in Saudi Arabia
Mediterranean Games gold medalists for Morocco
Mediterranean Games medalists in football
Competitors at the 2013 Mediterranean Games